Pottinger Peak is a mountain on the eastern side of Hong Kong Island. It is located south of Chai Wan and Siu Sai Wan and north of Big Wave Bay. Initially known as Ma Tong Peak, it was renamed Pottinger Peak after Henry Pottinger, the first Governor of Hong Kong.

See also

List of mountains, peaks and hills in Hong Kong

References

Mountains, peaks and hills of Hong Kong
Chai Wan